Francis Osborne (1593–1659) was an English essayist.

Francis Osborne may also refer to:
Francis Osborne, 5th Duke of Leeds (1751–1799), British politician
Francis Osborne, 1st Baron Godolphin (1777–1850), British politician
Francis D'Arcy-Osborne, 7th Duke of Leeds (1798–1859), British politician
 Francis D'Arcy Osborne, 12th Duke of Leeds (1884–1964), British diplomat
Frank I. Osborne (Francis Irwin Osborne, 1853–1920), Attorney General of North Carolina, 1893–1896

See also
Francis C. Osborn Sr., businessman and teacher
Frank Osborne (disambiguation)
Frances Osborne (born 1969), British author